The Ethiopian bookbinding technique is a chain stitch sewing that looks similar to the multi section Coptic binding method. According to J. A. Szirmai, the chain stitch binding dates from about the sixteenth century in Ethiopia and Eritrea. These books typically had paired sewing stations, sewn using two needles for each pair of sewing stations (so if there are 2 holes, use 2 needles...or 6 holes, 6 needles etc.). The covers were wooden and attached by sewing through holes made into edge of the board. Most of these books were left uncovered without endbands.

Notes

Further reading
 Mellors,  J.,  and  A.  Parsons.  2002.  Ethiopian  bookmaking.  London: New Cross Books.
 Cockerell,  S.  1977.  Ethiopian  Binding. Design  Bookbinders Review 10: 5–9.
 Szirmai, J. [1999] 2000. The archaeology of medieval bookbinding. Reprint, Burlington: Ashgate Publishing Company. 
 Selassie, S. 1981. Bookmaking in Ethiopia. Leiden, Netherlands: Karstens Drukkers.

Bookbinding
Ethiopian culture
Eritrean culture